Into the Labyrinth (1993) is a fantasy novel by American writers Margaret Weis and Tracy Hickman, the sixth book by  in their The Death Gate Cycle.

Plot summary
The Seventh Gate is rumoured to give anyone who enters it the power to create and destroy worlds. Haplo is the only one who knows how to enter it, but he is not aware of his own knowledge.  Haplo is in mortal danger, with assassin Hugh and an ex-lover Marit having been sent after him by the villainous Lord Xar. Old enemies, the Sartan and Patryn, have crossed paths once more via the power of the Death Gate, and war is breaking out. 

After numerous adventures through various locations, including the Labyrinth, Marit is wounded, Haplo is abducted by Xar, and Alfred goes missing.

Reception

The book hit the bestseller lists for  Waldenbooks and B. Dalton.

References

1993 American novels
American fantasy novels
Novels by Margaret Weis
Novels by Tracy Hickman
The Death Gate Cycle novels